The Volkswagen Caddy is a panel van and leisure activity vehicle (M-segment) produced by the German automaker Volkswagen Group since 1980. It is sold in Europe and in other markets around the world. The Volkswagen Caddy was first introduced in North America in 1980 and in Europe in 1982. The first and second generations also had pick-up (coupe utility) variants.

The following vehicles are related to the Volkswagen Caddy and are also manufactured by the Volkswagen Group.
Typ 14 was derived from the Volkswagen Golf Mk1,
Typ 9K was derived from the Volkswagen Polo Mk3 (Volkswagen Caddy) / SEAT Ibiza Mk2 (SEAT Inca) platform,
Typ 9U was rebadged Škoda Felicia pickup,
Typ 2K was derived from the Volkswagen Touran platform with Golf Mk5 front suspension,
Typ SB was rebadged for the third generation of the Ford Tourneo Connect since 2021.

First generation (Typ 14; 1979)

Released in 1979, the first Volkswagen Caddy is a coupe utility and van based on the Volkswagen Group A1 platform, shared with the small family car Volkswagen Golf Mk1.

Volkswagen Typ is: 
147 = LHD (Left hand drive)
148 = RHD (Right hand drive)

Rabbit Pickup

The Caddy came to fruition when Volkswagen of America was experimenting with Golf derivatives, developing an estate and a pickup truck with a  bed. VW of America's engineering team was led by Duane Miller, who acknowledged the initial design was completed in partnership with Sheller Globe.

Volkswagen of America was interested in the pickup, and Volkswagen released the Volkswagen Rabbit Pickup in North America, produced at the Volkswagen Westmoreland Assembly Plant in Pennsylvania from 1978 to 1984. Trim levels such as LX and Sportruck were available.

One unique feature of the diesel was that it came with a five-speed gearbox, with the fifth gear, carrying a 0.76:1 ratio, labeled as E for "Economy".

The first cars under the name Rabbit Pickup were sold in the United States in late 1979 for the 1980 model year, delayed from a planned spring 1979 rollout. It was not sold as the Caddy until three years later, when the model was introduced to Europe as the Caddy. Cosmetically, the North American Rabbit Pickup had rectangular headlamps, while the rest of the world received round headlamps.

The Volkswagen Rabbit Pickup competed with compact pickups, such as the Ford Courier, Datsun Truck, Toyota Hilux, Dodge Rampage and Subaru BRAT.

Worldwide
The Caddy nameplate was never used in North America. Its first use was in 1982, when the vehicle was released in Europe. European Caddys were built in Volkswagen's plant TAS in Sarajevo, Bosnia and Herzegovina (at the time SFR Yugoslavia), between 1982 and 1992. A fiberglass-reinforced plastic box cap was available to cover the open bed, turning the Caddy into a small panel van with an enclosed  of cargo volume, and it also could be used as a caravan with an appropriate in-bed unit.

The original Caddy also was produced in Uitenhage, South Africa from 1981 until 2007, alongside the first generation Golf itself (which was sold until 2009). 

Worldwide production of the first-generation Typ 14 Rabbit Pickup/Caddy totaled more than 207,000 vehicles. For the pickup truck market, Volkswagen sold the Taro, a rebranded Toyota Hilux, from 1989 to 1997; the Caddy name continued in 1995 as a slightly smaller panel van and multi-purpose vehicle developed with Škoda and SEAT.

Engine specs
The 1979–1984 Caddy pickup used the following engines:

 1.5 petrol EA827 1.5:  /  @2500
 1.5 diesel (1980): 
 1.6 diesel EA827 1.6 R4 D:  @4800 /  @3000
 1.6 diesel EA827 1.6 R4 D:  /  @2300
 1.6 petrol EA827 1.6:  /  @2500
 1.7 petrol
 1.6 turbodiesel (not marketed in the United States)
 1.8 petrol

However, during its long production in South Africa it has been available with the following engines:
 1.6 petrol: 
 1.6 petrol: 
 1.6 diesel: 
 1.8 petrol:

Gallery

Second generation (Typ 9K/9U; 1996)

Released in 1995, the Volkswagen Caddy Typ 9K, or Volkswagen Polo Caddy, was a light van, designed by Volkswagen's Spanish subsidiary SEAT, and derived from the SEAT Ibiza 6K, on the Volkswagen Group A03 platform.

It was built in Spain, at the Martorell factory of SEAT, from 1996 to 2004. Its twin, the SEAT Inca, was quickly phased out when the SEAT marque was realigned as the "sporty" branch of the Volkswagen Group.

It was in production in Argentina until 2008 for the Latin American market. It received a cosmetic facelift in 2005, similar to the post 1999 Volkswagen Polo Mk3.

Features
Length: 
Loading area: 2.6 m2
Loading volume: 2.9 m3
Payload: 
Two rear doors
Partition separating loading from driving space
Instruments with adjustable lighting
Power steering
Rear window heater
Rear wiper
Dust and pollen filter
Side impact protection
Safety steering column with collapsible steering wheel
Two head restraints
Three-point seatbelts
Driver airbag with optional passenger airbag
ABS with Electronic Differential Lock (EDL)
Air conditioner

Note: The electronic differential lock (EDL) employed by Volkswagen is not a differential lock at all despite its name. Sensors monitor wheel speeds, and if one is rotating substantially faster than the other (i.e., slipping), the EDL system momentarily brakes it. This effectively transfers all the power to the other wheel.

Caddy Typ 9U

Released in 1996 to complement the Typ 9K Caddy range, the rebadged Škoda Felicia Utility was the entry level light commercial vehicle for the VWCV range.

The Typ 9U Caddy was built in Škoda Auto's Kvasiny, Czech Republic plant.

Features of Typ 9U Caddy
 payload rating
2.0 m2 loading area
length: 
width: 
turning circle: 
3 point seatbelts
option of twin airbags
option of ABS brakes
option of air conditioning, standard in Petrol engined models.

Third generation (Typ 2K; 2003)

The third generation of Volkswagen Caddy debuted at the end of 2003, at the RAI Commercial Vehicle Show in Amsterdam, Volkswagen Commercial Vehicles debuted the Typ 2K Caddy panel van.

The Typ 2K shares 50% of its modules with the Volkswagen Golf Mk5 and Volkswagen Touran. The new model Caddy has a more aerodynamic design, the angle of the windscreen and A pillar is more horizontal, making the dashboard bigger and the bonnet (hood) smaller.

There are two body sizes: "normal" and Maxi. These can both be configured as a Panel Van, a Window Panel Van, Kombi (spartan passenger version), Caddy Life (family version), and a Camping version called the Caddy Tramper or Caddy Life Camper.

A Caddy Life or Kombi seats up to five in two rows while a Caddy Life Maxi or Kombi Maxi seats up to seven in three rows. The Life version has interior trimmings like that of a conventional five seater wagon while the Kombi is a naked panel van with windows and seats. The difference in road noise between the two is described by some as substantial.

Caddy Panel (2010–present)
The Caddy Panel grew in size over the Caddy Typ 9K, it measures in length , width , height , wheelbase , has a  payload, and a loading volume of 3.2 m3. The current shape Typ 2K Caddy, on sale in Europe since 2003, is a leisure activity vehicle with Volkswagen Golf Mk5 front suspension.

It resembles the compact MPV Touran, and is assembled at the Poznań factory in Poland. In May 2007, British Gas signed a landmark deal which saw 1,000 vans being supplied to the firm, which were fitted with a bespoke racking system and a speed limiter, designed by Siemens. The deal was renewed in September 2015.

Caddy Life

The Caddy Life, a seven-seat passenger oriented People Mover, debuted at the 2004 Geneva Motor Show. It comes with twin sliding doors and a  payload.

Caddy Life has a flexible seating system. The two rear bench seat rows can be taken out of the vehicle altogether to give the vehicle 2850 litres of cargo room; in addition, the Caddy Life has a  towing capacity.
 
In 2005, a Special Edition Caddy Life Colour Concept with two distinctive colours, Red Spice and Ravenna Blue, was released with upholstery fabrics, floor mats and a variety of other elements on the dash panel in the same colour as the exterior body, and a leather trimmed steering wheel, gear and handbrake lever.

Caddy Maxi and Caddy Maxi Life

Debuting at the 2007 Frankfurt Motor Show, Volkswagen Commercial Vehicles presented the Caddy Maxi Life the people mover version of the Maxi range. The Caddy Maxi range carried over all of the Caddy engine and debuted the 2.0L TDI engine producing .

The Caddy Maxi Tramper, the camping version of the Caddy Maxi, debuted at the 2008 AMI Leipzig Motor Show along with the Caddy Maxi EcoFuel Study.

Caddy Life Tramper (Camper)

Based on the Caddy Life the Tramper or Camper (Australia) package comes with two seats and a table, a fold out awning that is packaged within the rear tailgate, a bed that is made by folding down the seats measures 1.10 m x 2.0 m, also curtains are standard for privacy, options include a seven-litre cool box.

Carrera Cup Edition
The Caddy Carrera Cup Edition is a limited (250 units) version for the Swedish market. It is based on the 2.0L TDi model with black 17 inch wheels with 225/45R17 tires, a new body kit, white body with red trim, black and red leather sport seats, a fire extinguisher under the passenger's seat, a sport leather steering wheel and gear knob.

The vehicle has MSRP of 250,000 Swedish krona (US$34,200 or €22,000).

Caddy 4Motion
At the 2008 IAA (Hannover Motor Show), Volkswagen Commercial Vehicles revealed the all wheel drive Caddy 4Motion range teamed with the 1.9 TDI engine and manual transmission.

Early in 2010, the Caddy Maxi range will receive the 4Motion drivetrain.

Caddy in Australia
Since its introduction in the Australian market in 2003, the Caddy range has taken the market lead for small vans, with a 42% share in 2007. Even with the more premium pricing over its competition, buyers are still willing to pay more for the TDI and DSG transmission options.

Awards
Professional Van and Light Truck Magazine Small Van of the Year 2007 (United Kingdom)
Van Fleet World Best Small Van 2007 (United Kingdom)
Fleet News – 2008 Best Small Van Award
Professional Van and Light Truck Magazine Small Van of the Year 2008 (United Kingdom) – Caddy Maxi
Delivery Magazine Award – 2008 Best Small Van Caddy Maxi
What Van? (United Kingdom) – Editor's Choice 2008 Caddy Maxi

Engines
1.2  –  –  (petrol)
1.2 TSI –  –  (petrol)
1.4 16V –  –  (petrol) (discontinued)
1.4 16V –  –  (petrol) (discontinued)
1.6 8V –  –  (petrol) (discontinued)
1.6 TDI –  –  (diesel)
1.6 TDI –  –  (diesel)
1.9 TDI –  –  (diesel) (discontinued)
1.9 TDI –  –  (diesel) (discontinued)
2.0 SDI –  –  (diesel) (only for panel van and panel window van) (discontinued)
2.0 TDI – 
2.0 TDI –  –  (diesel)
2.0 TDI –  –  (diesel)
2.0 TDI –  –  (diesel) (only for Caddy Maxi)
2.0 EcoFuel –  –  (CNG)

Facelift

2010

Towards the end of 2010, the Caddy underwent a facelift to match the new design language of Volkswagen vehicles. Changes included a front with new headlights and grille from the Touran Mk2 which is similar to the Volkswagen Golf Mk6.

2015

In 2015, it underwent a second facelift consisting of a new front fascia, roof spoiler and a new interior to keep it competitive alongside its more modern rivals.
Referred to as Caddy 2K SA (or Mk4/MkIV). It is not based on the new Volkswagen Group MQB platform, but it may be differentiated when compared to the new Touran front end.

Other versions

In 2012, Volkswagen launched the Cross Caddy model with a series of crossover-inspired aesthetic changes. In 2015, the Caddy Alltrack, the successor to the CrossCaddy, debuted at the Frankfurt Motor Show.

Fourth generation (Typ SB; 2020)

The fourth-generation Caddy was unveiled in February 2020. For the first time, it is based on the Volkswagen MQB platform. The switch to MQB has enabled VW to offer new tech to the Caddy lineup, including Travel Assist, the new oncoming vehicle braking when turning function, connected infotainment systems and digitalized controls. VW is offering the estate and MPV in Kombi, Caddy, Life, Move, and Style trim levels, while the delivery van will be offered in multiple trim levels; for each variant, "Maxi" is appended to the name to designate the long-wheelbase variant. It went on sale in November 2020.

The design team responsible for the Typ SB was led by Albert Kirzinger.

Models
The Caddy is available in a light commercial vehicle (LCV) variant with two seats (Caddy Cargo) or a multi-purpose vehicle (MPV) with five or seven seats (Caddy/Caddy Life). There is also a five-seat model prepared for camping, with a slide-out kitchenette in lieu of the third seating row of the MPV (Caddy California). All versions are available with regular or extended wheelbase (Maxi).

In 2021, the Ford Tourneo Connect was announced as a rebadged Caddy, the first model developed under the Ford-Volkswagen partnership. Prior Ford MPVs in this size class have been based on the Ford Transit Connect. The Tourneo Connect shares the Volkswagen Caddy's engine lineup, with the EA288-evo rebranded to EcoBlue and the EA211-evo rebranded to EcoBoost. Deliveries are scheduled to commence in Spring 2022.

Engines

References

External links

1980s cars
1990s cars
2000s cars
Euro NCAP small MPVs
Coupé utilities
Vans
Mini MPVs
Taxi vehicles
Vehicles introduced in 1980
Caddy